The Canadian Communications Foundation (CCF) is a Canadian nonprofit organization which documents the history of broadcasting in Canada, particularly radio and television. Since 1995, the organization has distributed its collection via an internet website. It also provides a history of radio and television stations, including networks, programs, broadcasters and many others.

The CCF was established in 1967, by the Canadian Association of Broadcasters. Its mission: to "commemorate throughout Canada the development of electronic communications". In the ensuing years, the project moved forward slowly, perhaps because broadcasters were too preoccupied with the challenges of the present and the future to their industry to be able to properly reflect on or to chronicle the past. But, all the while, a search was carried on to find the ideal vehicle with which to fulfill the mission. It was not until the potential of the Internet was revealed and realized that the ideal vehicle was found and two veteran Canadian broadcasters became involved in CCF.

On December 31, 2014, Pip Wedge resigned from the presidency of the foundation, and on January 1, 2015, Dr. Evelyn Ellerman became president, Jack Ruttle was elected as vice-president, and Pip Wedge was appointed as executive director of the foundation.

The following past and present broadcasting industry executives and university faculty members have served on the board of the foundation in a voluntary capacity at various times since 1996: Ross McCreath, Lyman Potts, Pip Wedge, Jon Keeble, Mrs. Peggy Miller, Professor Michael Murphy, Peter O'Neill, Terry Scott, Fil Fraser, Bruce Raymond, Jim Macdonald, Hal Blackadar, Peter Searle, Nevin Grant, Charles Fenton, Bob Macdonald, Yvon Chouinard, Don Smith, J. Terry Strain, Mrs. Jean Caine, Gerry Acton, James Nelles, H.T. "Mac" McCurdy, Bruce Hogle, Craig Roskin, Dr. Evelyn Ellerman, Ted Barris, Jack Ruttle, Dr. Asma Sayed and Darren Harkness.

See also
Canadian Association of Broadcasters

External links
The origins of the CCF website

1967 establishments in Canada
History websites of Canada
Radio organizations in Canada
Television organizations in Canada